BacDive (the Bacterial Diversity Metadatabase) is a bacterial metadatabase that provides strain-linked information about bacterial and archaeal biodiversity.

Introduction 
BacDive is a resource for different kind of metadata like taxonomy, morphology, physiology, environment and molecular-biology.

The majority of data is manually annotated and curated. With the release in December 2022 BacDive offers information for 93,254 strains, including 19,313 type strains.
The database is hosted by the Leibniz Institute DSMZ - German Collection of Microorganisms and Cell Cultures GmbH and is part of de.NBI the German Network for Bioinformatics Infrastructure, as well as Elixir the European Network for Bioinformatics. In December 2022 BacDive was selected by the Global Biodata Coalition as a Global Core Biodata Resource (GCBR). GCBRs are considered critical data resources for the global research endeavour in life sciences and biomedicine.

Content and Features

Database
The December release of the database encompassed over 1000 different data fields, divided into the categories "Name and taxonomic classification", "Morphology", "Culture and growth conditions,"Physiology and metabolism", "Isolation, sampling and environmental information." "Safety information", "Sequence information" and "Strain availability". The database comprised 1,922,166 entries, linked to the according strain and reference.
The data are retrieved from internal descriptions of culture collections, expert-compiled compendia and primary scientific literature like species descriptions.

Data access
Data can be accessed either via a GUI or via the RESTful web service. Using the GUI the user can choose between a simple search for searching strains by name, Culture collection number, NCBI Tax ID or INSDC sequence accession number, or the user can use the advanced search, which enables the search in 130 data fields and gives the opportunity of complex queries by combining several fields. Data can be downloaded in PDF format (for single strains) or in CSV format for larger data sets (for multiple strains).
Via the RESTful web service portal BacDive content can be accessed automaticly (a free registration is needed).To support the use of the API, software clients in Python and R are available.

Other databases 
For data that are outside the focus of BacDive, links to other databases are provided that deliver strain-associated data:
SILVA
BRENDA
List of Prokaryotic names with Standing in Nomenclature
Straininfo.net
EBI
NCBI
MicrobeAtlas

References

External links

Simple search at BacDive
Advanced search at BacDive
Web services at BacDive

Metadata
Online databases